The following highways in Virginia have been known as State Route 77:
 State Route 77 (Virginia 1933-1940), now State Route 75
 State Route 77 (Virginia 1940-1942), now part of State Route 700
 Interstate 77 in Virginia, late 1950s – present